Fran Amos (born January 12, 1939) is an American politician and businesswoman who served as a member of the Michigan State House of Representatives, representing the 43rd District from 2003 to 2009.

Early life and education 
Amos was born in Oakland County, Michigan. She earned a Bachelor of Science degree in Management from Oakland University in 1980.

Career
Prior to her service in the House of Representatives, she was an Oakland County, Michigan Commissioner for four terms. During her service for Oakland County, she was widely credited with the privatization of mental health services. Amos retired as an executive from Bell System.

During her tenure, Amos was one of four Republican women serving in the Michigan Legislature and the only female Republican serving on the House Appropriations Committee. Amos represented the 43rd District from 2003 to 2009.

Candidacy for Michigan Senate

In 2010, Amos unsuccessfully ran for the Michigan Senate in District 26, which covers the townships of Waterford, Springfield, Groveland and Brandon in Oakland County. In Genesee County it covers the townships of Grand Blanc, Atlas, Davison, Forest, Mt Morris, Thetford, Richfield and Vienna as well as the cities of Burton, Clio, Davison and Mt Morris and the villages of Goodrich and Otisville.

Personal life 
Amos and her husband, Ed, have two children.

Electoral history 

|- style="background-color:#E9E9E9"
! align=left valign=top | 2002 Candidate
! align=right | Party
! align=right | Popular votes
! align=right | Vote percentage
|-
|align=left valign=top|Fran Amos
|valign="top"|Republican
|valign="top"|14,788
|valign="top"|52.91%
|-
|align=left valign=top|Betty Fortino
|valign="top"|Democrat
|valign="top"|13,157
|valign="top"|47.08%
|- style="background-color:#E9E9E9"
! align=left valign=top | 2004 Candidate
! align=right | Party
! align=right | Popular votes
! align=right | Vote percentage
|-
|align=left valign=top|Fran Amos
|valign="top"|Republican
|valign="top"|23,665
|valign="top"|56.53%
|-
|align=left valign=top|Scott Hudson
|valign="top"|Democrat
|valign="top"|18,193
|valign="top"|43.46%
|- style="background-color:#E9E9E9"
! align=left valign=top | 2006 Candidate
! align=right | Party
! align=right | Popular votes
! align=right | Vote percentage
|-
|align=left valign=top|Fran Amos
|valign="top"|Republican
|valign="top"|19,292
|valign="top"|59.00%
|-
|align=left valign=top|Kellie Riddell
|valign="top"|Democrat
|valign="top"|13,406
|valign="top"|40.99%
|}

References

County commissioners in Michigan
Living people
Republican Party members of the Michigan House of Representatives
1939 births
Oakland University alumni
Women state legislators in Michigan
21st-century American politicians
21st-century American women politicians
20th-century American politicians
20th-century American women politicians
People from Oakland County, Michigan